A spire is a tapering conical or pyramidal structure on the top of a building.

Spire may also refer to:

Places

Geography
 Spire, French name of the German city Speyer
 The Spire (Graham Land), a rock pinnacle in Antarctica
 The Spire (Rampart Ridge), a rock pinnacle in Antarctica
 Spire Peaks, a mountain in Canada
 Spire Point, a mountain in Washington state

Buildings and structures
 Spire (Seattle building), planned building, Washington, US
 Chicago Spire, a cancelled skyscraper in Chicago, US
 Spire of Dublin, a sculpture in Dublin
 Spire London, a planned building near Canary Wharf

Arts, entertainment, and media

Comics
 Spire Christian Comics
 The Spire (comics), 2015

Other uses in arts, entertainment, and media
 Spire (social networking service)
 A fictional character in the video game Metroid Prime Hunters
A Spire for Mansfield or A-Spire, a sculpture in Mansfield, Nottinghamshire, England
 A fictional world in the video game Myst IV: Revelation
Slay the Spire, a video game
 Spire FM, a UK radio station
 The Spire, a 1964 novel by William Golding

Brands and enterprises
 Spire (activity tracker), a wearable device
 Spire Credit Union, Minnesota, US
 Spire Global, a data company
 Spire Healthcare, UK
 Spire Inc, St. Louis, Missouri, US

Science and technology
 Spire (mollusc), part of the shell
 Spire Elite in InterContinental Hotels Group loyalty program
 Herschel Space Observatory's Spectral and Photometric Imaging Receiver
 Systematic Protein Investigative Research Environment, a mass spectrometry analysis site
SPIRE, the export control system used by the UK government

Sports
 SPIRE Institute, a U.S. Olympic training facility: See United States Olympic Training Center

See also
 Spires (disambiguation)